John Thayer may refer to:

Politicians
John R. Thayer (1845–1916), member of the United States House of Representatives from Massachusetts
John A. Thayer (1857–1917), member of the United States House of Representatives from Massachusetts
John Milton Thayer (1820–1906), United States Senator from Nebraska and Civil War general

Others
John Thayer (priest) (1755–1815), Boston priest
John B. Thayer (1862–1912), American cricketer and businessman who died on the RMS Titanic
Jack Thayer (1894–1945), his son, survivor of the Titanic sinking
Jack G. Thayer (1922–1995), American radio executive and disc jockey
John Thayer (ornithologist) (1862–1949), American amateur ornithologist
John M. Thayer (judge), Connecticut Supreme Court judge

See also
John Theyer (1597–1673), English royalist lawyer and writer, antiquary and bibliophile
Thayer (disambiguation)